Paint Creek Township is one of eighteen townships in Allamakee County, Iowa, USA.  At the 2010 census, its population was 544.

History

Paint Creek Township was organized in 1852.

Geography
According to the USGS, it contains three cemeteries: East Paint Creek Synod, Maple Hill and Waterville Lutheran.

References

External links
 US-Counties.com
 City-Data.com

Townships in Allamakee County, Iowa
Townships in Iowa
1852 establishments in Iowa
Populated places established in 1852